The 2015–16 season was Laboral Kutxa Baskonia's 56th in existence and the club's 33rd consecutive season in the top flight of Spanish basketball. Baskonia was involved in three competitions.

Players

Squad information

Players in

|}

Total spending:  €0

Players out

|}

Total income:  €0

Total expenditure: €0

Club

Technical staff

Kit
Supplier: Hummel / Sponsor: Laboral Kutxa

Pre-season and friendlies

Competitions

Overall

Overview

Liga ACB

League table

Results summary

Results by round

Matches

Results overview

ACB Playoffs

Quarterfinals

Semifinals

Euroleague

Regular season

Top 16

Playoffs

Final Four

Copa del Rey

Statistics

Liga ACB

ACB Playoffs

Copa del Rey

Euroleague

References

External links
 Official website
 Saski Baskonia at ACB.com 
 Saski Baskonia at Euroleague.net

Baskonia
 
Baskonia